Ozamia is a genus of snout moths in the subfamily Phycitinae. It was described by George Hampson in 1901. Some sources list it as a synonym of Zophodia, while others retain it as a valid genus.

Species
 Ozamia clarefacta Dyar, 1919
 Ozamia fuscomaculella (W. S. Wright, 1916)
 Ozamia hemilutella Dyar, 1922
 Ozamia immorella (Dyar, 1913)
 Ozamia lucidalis (Walker, 1863)
 Ozamia punicans Heinrich, 1939
 Ozamia stigmaferella (Dyar, 1922)
 Ozamia thalassophila Dyar, 1925

References

Phycitini
Pyralidae genera
Taxa named by George Hampson